The steppe bison or steppe wisent (Bison priscus) is an extinct species of bison that was once found on the mammoth steppe where its range included British Isles, Europe, Central Asia, Northern to Northeastern Asia including Japanese archipelago, Beringia, and central North America, from northwest Canada to Mexico during the Quaternary. This wide distribution is sometimes called the Pleistocene bison belt, compared to the Great bison belt. Three chronological subspecies, Bison priscus priscus, Bison priscus mediator, and Bison priscus gigas, have been suggested.

Evolution

The steppe bison first appeared during the mid Middle Pleistocene in eastern Eurasia, subsequently dispersing westwards as far as Western Europe. During the late Middle Pleistocene, around 195,000-135,000 years ago, the steppe bison migrated across the Bering land bridge into North America, becoming ancestral to modern American bison, as well as extinct forms such as the largest known bison, the long-horned Bison latifrons, and the smaller Bison antiquus.

Description 
The tips of the horns were a meter apart, the horns themselves being over half a meter long.

Bison priscus gigas is the largest known bison of Eurasia.

The steppe bison was also anatomically similar to the European bison (Bison bonasus), to the point of difficulty distinguishing between the two when complete skeletons are unavailable. The two species were close enough to interbreed; however they were also genetically distinct, indicating that interbreeding was in fact rare, possibly as a result of niche partitioning between the species.

Extinction 
The steppe bison distribution contracted to the north after the end of the Pleistocene, surviving into the mid Holocene before becoming extinct. A steppe bison skeleton was radiocarbon dated to 5,400 years Before Present (c. 3450 BCE) in Alaska. B. priscus remains in the northern Angara River in Asia were dated to 2550-2450 BCE, and in the Oyat River in Leningrad Oblast, Russia to 1130-1060 BCE.

Discoveries

Steppe bison appear in cave art, notably in the Cave of Altamira and Lascaux, and the carving Bison Licking Insect Bite, and have been found in naturally ice-preserved form.

Blue Babe is the 36,000-year-old mummy of a male steppe bison which was discovered north of Fairbanks, Alaska, in July 1979. The mummy was noticed by a gold miner who named the mummy Blue Babe – "Babe" for Paul Bunyan's mythical giant ox, permanently turned blue when he was buried to the horns in a blizzard (Blue Babe's own bluish cast was caused by a coating of vivianite, a blue iron phosphate covering much of the specimen). Blue Babe is also frequently referenced when talking about scientists eating their own specimens: the research team that was preparing it for permanent display in the University of Alaska Museum removed a portion of the mummy's neck, stewed it, and dined on it to celebrate the accomplishment.

In 2011, a 9,300-year-old mummy was found at Yukagir in Siberia.

In 2016, a frozen tail was discovered in the north of the Republic of Sakha in Russia. The exact age was not clear, but tests showed it was not younger than 8,000 years old. A team of Russian and South Korean scientists proposed extracting DNA from the specimen and cloning it in the future.

References 

Bison
Prehistoric bovids
Holocene extinctions
Prehistoric even-toed ungulates
Prehistoric mammals of North America
Quaternary mammals of Asia
Pleistocene mammals of Europe
Pleistocene mammals of Asia
Pleistocene mammals of North America
Mammals described in 1827
Fossil taxa described in 1827
Pleistocene first appearances
Taxa named by Ludwig Heinrich Bojanus